Kazimierz Puczyński (nom de guerre Wroński) was a Polish hydrotechnology specialist, graduate of the Warsaw University of Technology with engineering degree, soldier of the Polish Underground State, participant of the Warsaw Uprising.

He was born in 1908, and some time in the interwar period, he graduated from the University of Technology in Warsaw. During the Warsaw Uprising he was commandant of the 104th Company of Syndicalists. After the war, Puczyński worked in the Engineering Office in Warsaw as well as the Hydrology Magazine. He died on September 26, 2007 in Warsaw and was buried at the Powązki Military Cemetery.

See also
 Polish contribution to World War II

References 

1908 births
2007 deaths
Polish resistance members of World War II
Engineers from Warsaw
Burials at Powązki Military Cemetery
Polish military personnel of World War II
Warsaw University of Technology alumni
Syndicalists
Warsaw Uprising insurgents